The Hunt for Red October is the debut novel by American author Tom Clancy, first published on October 1, 1984, by the Naval Institute Press. It depicts Soviet submarine captain Marko Ramius as he seemingly goes rogue with his country's cutting-edge ballistic missile submarine Red October, and marks the first appearance of Clancy's most popular fictional character, Jack Ryan, an analyst working for the Central Intelligence Agency, as he must prove his theory that Ramius had intended to defect to the United States.

The Hunt for Red October launched Clancy's successful career as a novelist, especially after then-U.S. President Ronald Reagan remarked that he had enjoyed reading the book. A film adaptation was released on March 2, 1990, and several computer and video games based on the book have been developed. The book was instrumental in bringing the book genre of techno-thriller into the mainstream.

Plot summary
During the Cold War, Marko Ramius, a Soviet Navy submarine commander, plans to defect to the United States with the  ballistic missile submarine Red October. It is equipped with a cutting-edge silent propulsion system, known as the "caterpillar drive", that makes audio detection by passive sonar extremely difficult and enables the submarine to sneak its way into American territorial waters and launch nuclear missiles with little to no warning. As the sub leaves the shipyard at Polyarny, Ramius kills his political officer, Ivan Putin, to ensure that he will not interfere. Ramius was ordered to conduct military exercises with Soviet  attack submarine V. K. Konovalov, commanded by his former student Viktor Tupolev, in order to test the effectiveness of the caterpillar drive. Instead, he plots a course for the North American coast, falsely informing the crew that they will be proceeding undetected all the way to Cuba. Before sailing, Ramius sends a letter to Admiral Yuri Padorin brazenly stating his intention to defect; the Soviet Northern Fleet then sails out to sink Red October under the pretext of a search and rescue mission.

Coincidentally, Red October passes near , a  under the command of Bart Mancuso, which is patrolling the entrance of a route used by Soviet submarines in the Reykjanes Ridge off Iceland. Dallas'''s sonar operator hears the sound of the stealth drive but does not immediately identify it as a submarine. As tensions rise between the U.S. and Soviet fleets due to the unannounced incursion of the Soviet Northern Fleet into Atlantic waters, the crew of Dallas analyzes tapes of Red October′s acoustic signature and realizes that it is the sound of a new propulsion system. Meanwhile, CIA analyst Jack Ryan finds out that the submarine's new construction variations house its stealth drive.

Later putting information about Ramius's letter together with the subsequent launch of the entire Northern Fleet, Ryan deduces Ramius's plans to defect. The U.S. military reluctantly agrees to assist, while planning for contingencies in case the Soviet fleet has intentions other than those inferred. After it is revealed that Ramius has informed Moscow of his plan for him and his officers to defect, Ryan becomes responsible for shepherding Ramius and his submarine away from the pursuing Soviet fleet and meets with Royal Navy acquaintance Admiral John White, commanding a task force from the aircraft carrier .

After Ramius fakes a reactor accident, the U.S. Navy evacuates Red Octobers crew using a DSRV rescue submarine. Ramius and his officers stay behind, claiming that they plan to scuttle the submarine to prevent it getting into the hands of the Americans. In order to convince the Soviets that Red October has in fact been destroyed, a decommissioned U.S. ballistic missile submarine, is blown up underwater as a deception. A depth gauge taken from the main instrument panel of Red October is made to appear as if it had been salvaged from Ethan Allen′s wreckage. Meanwhile, Ryan, Mancuso, some of Dallas crew, and Owen Williams board Red October and meet Ramius face-to-face.

The deception succeeds in convincing Soviet observers that Red October has been lost and the Soviet forces withdraw, but Tupolev stays behind. Unbeknownst to anyone, Igor Loginov, a cook on Red October who is actually an undercover GRU intelligence officer, has remained aboard after the other crewmen evacuated. He attempts to destroy Red October by manually launching one of the submarine's missiles in its silo. Loginov is discovered and fatally shoots Captain Lieutenant Kamarov and seriously wounds Ramius and Williams. Ryan tries to reason with the GRU agent, who refuses to listen and is eventually killed in a firefight in the submarine's missile compartment.

Later, V.K. Konovalov happens upon what is initially believed to be an  submarine, being escorted by two other submarines. Based on its acoustical signature, Tupolev realizes that it is in fact Red October, and proceeds to engage it. The two U.S. submarines escorting Red October are prohibited from firing on Konovalov by rules of engagement, and Red October has no torpedomen on board. After a tense battle, Ramius manages to sink Konovalov by ramming it, killing Tupolev and his crew.

The Americans escort Red October safely into dry dock in Norfolk, Virginia, where it is analyzed by U.S. military intelligence. Ramius and his crew are taken to a CIA safehouse where they are given new identities, beginning their settlement into American life. Ryan is commended and debriefed by his superiors; he later flies back to his posting in London.

Characters
The Soviets
 Captain First Rank Marko Aleksandrovich Ramius: Soviet submarine captain who commands the Red October, the Soviet Navy's newest ballistic missile submarine. His decision to defect was spurred by personal factors. His wife, Natalia, had died at the hands of an intoxicated and incompetent doctor; however, the doctor escaped punishment because he was the son of a Politburo member. Natalia's untimely death, combined with Ramius's long-standing disillusionment with the callousness of Soviet rule and his fear of Red Octobers destabilizing effect on world affairs, exhausts his tolerance for the failings of the Soviet system.
 Captain Second Rank Viktor Aleksievich Tupolev: Commanding officer of the  attack submarine V. K. Konovalov and Ramius's former student.
 Captain Second Rank Vasily Borodin: Executive officer of Red October
 Dr. Yevgeni Konstantinovich Petrov: Red Octobers medical officer
 Igor Loginov: GRU intelligence officer, on duty aboard the Red October as a cook in order to prevent the defection or capture of the vessel
 Alexei Arbatov: Soviet ambassador to the United States
 Captain Second Rank Ivan Yurievich Putin: Political officer (zampolit) aboard the Red October. Killed by Ramius so that he will not interfere with his defection.
 Admiral Yuri Ilyich Padorin: Chief political officer for the Soviet Navy, Ramius's uncle-in-law and mentor

The Americans and the British
 Dr. John Patrick "Jack" Ryan: Central Intelligence Agency liaison to the Secret Intelligence Service; former Marine lieutenant 
 Commander Bartolomeo Vito "Bart" Mancuso, USN: Commanding officer of the  
 Sonar Technician 1st Class Ronald "Jonesy" Jones, USN: Sonarman aboard Dallas who first identifies Red October and its silent drive.
 Vice-Admiral John White, 8th Earl of Weston: British Royal Navy officer commanding the aircraft carrier ; also a personal friend of Ryan.
 Lieutenant Owen Williams, RN: British Royal Navy lieutenant serving aboard Invincible who accompanies Ryan to Red October because of his Russian language skills.
 Oliver Wendell "Skip" Tyler: Instructor at the United States Naval Academy in Annapolis, Maryland who does consulting work for the U.S. Navy. A former naval officer, he was tasked by Ryan with identifying the construction variations in Red October, which he determines to be housing a new, silent propulsion system.
 Captain Robert Jefferson "Robby" Jackson, USN: Commanding officer of Fighter Squadron VF-41 out of the aircraft carrier 
 Dr. Jeffrey Pelt: National Security Advisor to the U.S. President
 Arthur Moore: Director of Central Intelligence
 Vice Admiral James Greer, USN: CIA Deputy Director for Intelligence
 Robert Ritter': CIA Deputy Director for Operations

ThemesThe Hunt for Red October introduced Tom Clancy's writing style, which included technical details about weaponry, submarines, espionage, and the military. The accurate nature of Clancy's writing was well known among the American military such that Clancy remarked in a 1986 interview: "When I met Navy Secretary John Lehman last year, the first thing he asked me about the book was, 'Who the hell cleared it?

The novel shares elements with James Clavell's works, particularly Shōgun (1975) and Noble House (1981), where political power is used instead of physical confrontation with an enemy. Clancy portrays the Soviets, especially Captain Ramius, sympathetically, and most characters are understandable in their actions and fears, while at the same time comparing and contrasting their philosophies and values against their American counterparts, who in turn are shown as more competent in their profession, this being explained by the US Navy being better equipped and trained than the Soviet sailors who are mostly conscripts.

In the novel, the US and its service personnel are unmistakably the "good guys". The central theme of the US being flawed, but ultimately a force for good and hope in the world is something the author would explore more in his later novels. However, unlike The Hunt For Red October, these later novels often include negative American characters, motivated by power or greed.

In addition, The Hunt for Red October is considered a coming-of-age story regarding the main character Jack Ryan. However, instead of running away from responsibilities, a theme common in contemporary American literature, Clancy subverts the convention by having Ryan rushing toward the burdens of the adult world. Moreover, the book introduced Jack Ryan as a new archetype of the American hero — an everyman who uses his prior knowledge instead of physical power in solving a particular crisis.

Development
From a young age, Clancy was an avid reader of naval history and sea exploration. However, he was later rejected from serving in the military because of his poor eyesight. Since graduating from high school and eventually earning an English major, he always wanted to write a novel. He eventually worked as an insurance agent for a small business owned by his then-wife's family.

In his spare time, Clancy started working on The Hunt for Red October on November 11, 1982, and finished it four months later on February 23, 1983. Contrary to popular belief that Clancy had access to top-secret intelligence in researching for the novel, he consulted technical manuals, discussions with former submariners and books like Norman Polmar’s Guide to the Soviet Navy and Combat Fleets of the World in order to maintain accuracy in describing Soviet submarines.

He then submitted the first draft of the novel to the Naval Institute Press, where he previously wrote an article on the MX missile for their magazine Proceedings of the U.S. Naval Institute. Three weeks later, the publication company returned his manuscript, along with a request to cut about a hundred pages’ worth of numerous technical details. After fixing his work, Clancy then sold The Hunt for Red October to the Naval Institute Press for a modest sum of $5,000.

Having recently decided to publish fiction, the publication company made Clancy's work their first published novel. Editor Deborah Grosvenor later recalled convincing the publishers: “I think we have a potential best-seller here, and if we don’t grab this thing, somebody else would." She believed Clancy had an "innate storytelling ability, and his characters had this very witty dialogue".

 Theories about source of the story 
 The 2005 book The Last Sentry: Valery Sablin and the True Hunt for Red October by Gregory D Young and Nate Braden suggests that the novel was based on the Soviet frigate Storozhevoy mutiny in 1975.
 The 2020 Muse Entertainment documentary The Real Hunt for Red October claims that the story of Red October is based on the loss of Soviet submarine K-129, which was lost in 1968, and recovered by 1974's Project Azorian.

Reception
Critical
The book received critical acclaim, especially from the American government. U.S. President Ronald Reagan had pronounced the book, which was given to him as a Christmas gift, as “the perfect yarn” and “unputdownable”; his endorsement eventually boosted the novel's sales and solidified Clancy's reputation as a bestselling author. Regarding the reception, Clancy remarked: “I was thunderstruck, dumbfounded, bowled over, amazed. But I wasn't surprised." Many members of the White House were fans of the book.The Hunt for Red October was also popular among the military. The Washington Post, in its original review, praised the novel as "the most satisfactory novel of a sea chase since C.S. Forester perfected the form."

Commercial
Due to an extensive marketing campaign by the Naval Institute Press for their first published work of fiction, which was initially aimed at the military, the book sold 45,000 copies by March 1985. Clancy said in a 1991 interview: “I thought we’d sell maybe five thousand or ten thousand hardcovers and that would be the end of it. I never really thought about making money.”

After Reagan's endorsement, The Hunt for Red October topped the national bestseller lists, particularly The New York Times. It eventually sold more than 365,000 copies in hardcover. After securing the paperback rights to Berkley Books for $49,500, the novel sold another 4.3 million copies.

Adaptations
Film

The novel was adapted as a feature film, which was released in the United States on March 2, 1990, months after the Cold War ended. Captain Marko Ramius was played by Sean Connery, while Alec Baldwin played Jack Ryan. It serves as the first entry in the Jack Ryan film series, which would later follow a chronological order differing from the novels. The movie is a nearly faithful depiction of the novel even though there are many deviations, including Red October traveling up the Penobscot River in Maine to dry dock, the omission of the Royal Navy task force including Ryan's time aboard , and the "caterpillar drive" being described as a magnetohydrodynamic drive system, essentially, "a jet engine for the water", rather than a drive powered by a series of mechanical impellers inside flow tunnels. Although in both the novel and movie, the caterpillar drive was supposed to be undetectably silent.

The film received mainly positive reviews from critics, holding an 88% rating from Rotten Tomatoes based on 74 reviews. It was the sixth top-grossing film of the year, generating $122 million in North America and more than $200 million worldwide in box office. In a 1991 interview, Clancy remarked of the film's success: "It was reasonably true to the spirit of the book, although the movie had a lot of technical errors in it and some changes in the story which I do not think is necessary. But you have to remember that the printed word and visual representation on the screen are two different art forms and they have very different roles."

Games

The novel also became the basis for three computer, video, and console games. One version, a combination of a submarine simulator and strategy game, was released in 1987 and received positive reviews. Another game based on the movie was released in 1990. The console game was released in 1991 for the Nintendo Entertainment System and later for the Game Boy and Super Nintendo Entertainment System. In addition, a board game The Hunt for Red October, published in 1988 by TSR, Inc. became one of the all time bestselling wargames.

In late 2015, River Horse announced it had acquired the rights and intended to crowdfund another game based on the intellectual property.

LegacyThe Hunt for Red October popularized the book genre of techno-thriller into the mainstream. “Tom Clancy defined an era, not just of thrillers but of pop culture in general," said Jon Land, an author and marketing chair for the International Thriller Writers. "No one encapsulated the mindset and mentality of the Reagan era more, as the Cold War was heating up for the last time and we were entering a new age of modern warfare. Clancy's books tapped into our fears and helped define our psyches, even as he reinvigorated the thriller genre by bringing millions of new readers into the fold.”

On April 20, 2018, The Hunt for Red October was included in the list of 100 most-loved books in the U.S., compiled by PBS as part of their new series and multi-platform initiative The Great American Read.

The book appeared in a fake commercial ad serving as a teaser trailer for the third season of the Netflix web television series Stranger Things, which was released on July 16, 2018.

See also
 Jonas Pleškys
 Valery Sablin
 Crazy Ivan
 Soviet frigate Storozhevoy
 United States Naval Institute v. Charter Communications, Inc. Simas Kudirka

References

Further reading

 Gallagher, Mark. Action figures: Men, action films, and contemporary adventure narratives (Springer, 2006).
 Griffin, Benjamin. "The good guys win: Ronald Reagan, Tom Clancy, and the transformation of national security" (MA thesis, U of Texas, 2015).  online
 Hixson, Walter L. "Red Storm Rising: Tom Clancy Novels and the Cult of National Security." Diplomatic History 17.4 (1993): 599–614. 
 Outlaw, Leroy B. "Red Storm Rising-A Primer for a Future Conventional War in Central Europe"" (Army War College, 1988). online
 Payne, Matthew Thomas. Playing war: Military video games after 9/11 (NYU Press, 2016).
 Terdoslavich, William. The Jack Ryan Agenda: Policy and Politics in the Novels of Tom Clancy: An Unauthorized Analysis (Macmillan, 2005). excerpt

External links
 Thesis Mutiny Thesis by CDR Gregory Young US Naval Postgraduate School March 1982.  Courtesy of the Dudley Knox Library.
 Thesis. Mutiny Thesis by CDR Gregory Young US Naval Postgraduate School March 1982.  Tom Clancy gives thanks to CDR Young in the book.
 The Last Sentry. The true story that inspired The Hunt for Red October First Edition Points, photos of the first edition of The Hunt for Red October''

1984 American novels
1984 debut novels
Aircraft carriers in fiction
American novels adapted into films
American thriller novels
Defection in fiction
Fiction about mutinies
Novels about submarine warfare
Novels adapted into video games
Novels by Tom Clancy
Novels set during the Cold War
Ryanverse
Techno-thriller novels